Nicaragua pursues an independent foreign policy. A participant of the Central American Security Commission (CSC), Nicaragua also has taken a leading role in pressing for regional demilitarization and peaceful settlement of disputes within states in the region.

Nicaragua has submitted three territorial disputes, one with Honduras, another with Colombia, and the third with Costa Rica to the International Court of Justice for resolution.

International membership 
At the 1994 Summit of the Americas, Nicaragua joined six Central American neighbors in signing the Alliance for Sustainable Development, known as the Conjunta Centroamerica-USA or CONCAUSA, to promote sustainable economic development in the region.

Nicaragua belongs to the United Nations and several specialized and related agencies, including:
World Bank
International Monetary Fund (IMF)
World Trade Organization (WTO)
UN Educational, Scientific, and Cultural Organization (UNESCO)
World Health Organization (WHO)
Food and Agriculture Organization (FAO)
International Labour Organization (ILO)
UN Human Rights Commission (UNHRC)
Organization of American States (OAS)
Non-Aligned Movement (NAM)
International Atomic Energy Commission (IAEA)
Inter-American Development Bank (IDB)
Central American Common Market (CACM)
Central American Bank for Economic Integration (CABEI).
Bolivarian Alliance for the Americas (ALBA)
Caribbean Community (CARICOM)
Association of Caribbean States (ACS)
Community of Latin American and Caribbean States (CELAC)
Latin American Economic System (SELA)
Central American Integration System (SICA)

International disputes

 Territorial disputes with Colombia over the Archipelago de San Andres y Providencia and Quita Sueno Bank with respect to the maritime boundary question in the Golfo de Fonseca. The ICJ referred to the line determined by the 1900 Honduras-Nicaragua Mixed Boundary Commission and advised that some tripartite resolution among El Salvador, Honduras and Nicaragua likely would be required;
 Maritime boundary dispute with Honduras in the Caribbean Sea.
 Nicaragua is sovereign over the Rio San Juan, and by treaty Costa Rica has the right to navigate over part of the river with 'objects of commerce'.  A dispute emerged when Costa Rica tried to navigate with armed members of its security forces.

International relations with intergovernmental organizations and countries

Nicaragua signed a 3-year Poverty Reduction and Growth Facility (PRGF) with the International Monetary Fund (IMF) in October 2007. As part of the IMF program, the Government of Nicaragua agreed to implement free market policies linked to targets on fiscal discipline, poverty spending, and energy regulation. The lack of transparency surrounding Venezuelan bilateral assistance, channeled through state-run enterprises rather than the official budget, has become a serious issue for the IMF and international donors. On September 10, 2008, with misgivings about fiscal transparency, the IMF released an additional $30 million to Nicaragua, the second tranche of its $110 million PRGF.

The flawed municipal elections of November 2008 prompted a number of European donors to suspend direct budget support to Nicaragua, a move that created a severe budget shortfall for the government. This shortfall, in turn, caused the Government of Nicaragua to fall out of compliance with its PRGF obligations and led to a suspension of PRGF disbursements. The IMF is currently in negotiations with the Government of Nicaragua to reinstate disbursements.

Under current president Daniel Ortega, Nicaragua has stayed current with the Central American-Dominican Republic Free Trade Agreement, which entered into force for Nicaragua on April 1, 2006. Nicaragua exports to the United States, which account for 59% of Nicaragua's total exports, were $1.7 billion in 2008, up 45% from 2005. Textiles and apparel account for 55% of exports to the United States, while automobile wiring harnesses add another 11%.

Other leading export products are coffee, meat, cigars, sugar, ethanol, and fresh fruit and vegetables, all of which have seen remarkable growth since CAFTA-DR went into effect. Leading Nicaraguan exports also demonstrated increased diversity, with 274 new products shipped to the United States in the first year. U.S. exports to Nicaragua, meanwhile, were $1.1 billion in 2008, up 23% from 2005. Other important trading partners for Nicaragua are its Central American neighbors, Mexico, and the European Union. Nicaragua is negotiating a trade agreement with the European Union as part of a Central American bloc.

Despite important protections for investment included in CAFTA-DR, the investment climate has become relatively insecure since Ortega took office. According to the United States State Department, President Ortega's decision to support "radical regimes" such as Iran and Cuba, his harsh rhetoric against the United States and capitalism, and his use of government institutions to persecute political enemies and their businesses, has had a negative effect on perceptions of country risk, which by some accounts has quadrupled since he assumed office. The government reports foreign investment inflows totaled $506 million in 2008, including $123 million in telecommunications infrastructure and $120 million in energy generation.

There are over 100 companies operating in Nicaragua with some relation to a U.S. company, either as wholly or partly owned subsidiaries, franchisees, or exclusive distributors of U.S. products. The largest are in energy, financial services, textiles/apparel, manufacturing, and fisheries. However, many companies in the textile/apparel sector, including a $100 million U.S.-owned denim mill, had shuttered by 2017.

Poor enforcement of property rights deters both foreign and domestic investment, especially in real estate development and tourism. Conflicting claims and weak enforcement of property rights has invited property disputes and litigation. Establishing verifiable title history is often entangled in legalities relating to the expropriation of 28,000 properties by the revolutionary government that Ortega led in the 1980s. The situation is not helped by a court system that is widely believed to be corrupt and subject to political influence.

Illegal property seizures by private parties, occasionally in collaboration with corrupt municipal officials, often go unchallenged by the authorities, especially in the Atlantic regions and interior regions of the north, where property rights are poorly defined and rule of law is weak. Foreign investor interest along the Pacific Coast has motivated some unscrupulous people to challenge ownership rights in the Departments of Rivas and Chinandega, with the hope of achieving some sort of cash settlement.

In October 2022, the European Union declared non grata the Nicaraguan representative, Zoila Müller.

Bilateral relations

States with limited recognition
The following table includes Republic of China, Georgia, and some of the states with limited recognition:

See also
 List of diplomatic missions in Nicaragua
 List of diplomatic missions of Nicaragua
 Nicaragua v. United States

References

External links
 Ministry of Foreign Affairs of Nicaragua 
 ICJ Nicaragua v. Colombia (Preliminary Objections) and (Merits) and 2007 Preliminary Objections Judgment and ASIL and BBC and Colombia President and Colombia MFA and Analysis 20 Hague YIL 75-119 2008